Ferdinand Brossart was a German American prelate of the Roman Catholic Church. He was born in the Diocese of Speyer, and served from 1915 to 1923 as the fourth bishop of the Diocese of Covington.

Early life
Ferdinand Brossart was born on October 19, 1849 in the village Buechelberg, Rhenish Palatinate, in that time belonging to the German Kingdom of Bavaria. Today it is a part of the city Woerth am Rhein and belongs to the new German State of Rheinland-Pfalz. His parents Ferdinand Brossart and Catharina née Diesel were simple farmers. They emigrated to America when Ferdinand was two years old. First they landed in New Orleans, but moved very quick from here, for the outbreak of yellow-fever. Then they settled down in Cincinnati. The Brossarts moved across the river to southern Campbell County, in 1861.  Choosing to become a priest, Ferdinand Brossart studied at Mount Saint Mary Seminary in Cincinnati, Ohio and the American College at Louvain, Belgium.  He was ordained a priest for the Diocese of Covington by Bishop Toebbe on September 1, 1872.  Father Brossart became popular when Lexington suffered a smallpox epidemic, sacrificing his health to administer to the sick and dying. The priest was appointed Vicar General in 1888, along with being assigned as rector of the old cathedral. His 25th. ordination-jubilee he celebrated on a pilgrimage in Lourdes France. After Bishop Maes' death, Father Brossart was picked by Pope Benedict XV in November 1915.  Brossart is the only diocesan priest from Covington to have been chosen as bishop.

Bishop of Covington
Brossart was consecrated the fourth bishop of Covington by Archbishop Henry Moeller of Cincinnati on January 25, 1916.  Bishop Brossart was responsible for placing the finishing touches on the current cathedral, though it is still unfinished to this day.  During the First World War he had to suffer public attacks because he was a born German. He declared himself as a supporter of the American positions and developed a pronounced patriotic activity. In that frame he pushed also back the different emigration languages in his diocese (including his own motherlanguage) and allowed only Latin and English as the official prayer-languages. The prelate translated different German theological books into English, among them works of the famous monk Henry Denifle. Bishop Brossart served a long term, resigning on March 14, 1923, due to ill health.  Brossart retired to St. Anne Convent in Melbourne, Kentucky, where he died on August 6, 1930.  The bishop is the namesake of Bishop Brossart High School in Alexandria.

References

External links

 Diocese of Covington Entry on Bishop Brossart
 Memorial Page in honour of Bishop Ferdinand Brossart

Episcopal succession

Bavarian emigrants to the United States
1849 births
1930 deaths
Roman Catholic bishops of Covington
Catholic University of Leuven (1834–1968) alumni
American College of the Immaculate Conception alumni
People from the Palatinate (region)